Lupo Alberto ("Alberto the Wolf") is a famous Italian comic book series created by Guido Silvestri (Silver) in 1974. It details the adventures of Lupo Alberto, a blue wolf. The protagonist of the comic book, Lupo Alberto, takes the shape of the common man who has a goal in life and a certain amount of bad luck. Alberto, a resident of the McKenzie farm, always tries to steal a hen named Martha (who is his girlfriend), but Moses, a sheepdog, is the obstacle to his plans and does everything to stop him. The conflicts between Alberto and Moses were the subject of the first strips of the series.

Lupo Alberto made its first appearance in February 1974, with some strips published by Silvestri in Corriere dei Ragazzi, a 1970s magazine owned by Corriere della Sera. After a year, Dardo published the first series dedicated to this character. Since 1985 a series of monthly books has been released, following a short-lived series (composed of 8 issues) launched between 1983 and 1984. In 2009 an exhibition for the character's 35th anniversary was held.

The Lupo Alberto strips are especially popular among teenagers, and have spawned a rich merchandising franchise including such items as school diaries and greeting cards. As a consequence of its appeal on the youth, the Lupo Alberto character was used in the 1990s for a massive anti-AIDS campaign promoted by the Italian Ministry of Public Health, emphasizing safe sex and the use of condoms.

Characters
 Lupo Alberto - A blue wolf who is a resident of the McKenzie farm, Alberto pursues his relationship with Martha
 Martha (Marta) - A hen who is Alberto's girlfriend
 Moses (Mosè) - A sheepdog who is the obstacle to Alberto's plans
 Henry (Enrico) - A mole
 Esther (Cesira) - Henry's wife, a mole
 Alfred (Alfredo) - A turkey
 Ludwig (Lodovico) - A horse
 Einstein (Odoardo) - Einstein is Martha's cousin
 Joseph - A duck who has the nickname "Glycerin" ("Glicerina")
 Krug - A bull
 Omar - A rooster
 Silvietta - A sparrow
 Kant (Alcide) - A philosopher pig
 Alice - Martha's friend, a hen
 Relader - a dog who is a friend to Alberto

Animated series

In 1997 Rai Trade (1987–2011) and Mondo TV co-produced an animated series and label for Warner Bros. The series is available in Italian and English.

Video game
A video game adaptation of the comic strip was released for the Commodore 64, Amiga and Atari ST.

References

External links
 Official website 
 Official blog 
 "Albert the Wolf First Series." Mondo TV.
 "Lupo Alberto." Mondo TV. 
 "Albert the Wolf Second Series." Mondo TV.
 "Lupo Alberto." Biembi (official merchandise maker)
 

Italian comics titles
1974 establishments in Italy
1974 comics debuts
Fictional wolves
Italian comic strips
Italian comics characters
Humor comics
Comics about animals
Comics characters introduced in 1974
Comics adapted into television series
Comics adapted into animated series
Comics adapted into video games